David Akeeagok is a Canadian Inuk politician from Grise Fiord, Nunavut.

He was elected to the Legislative Assembly of Nunavut in the 2017 general election.

He represents the electoral district of Quttiktuq, and serves as Nunavut's Deputy Premier, Ministry offices of Economic Development and Transportation, Workers' Safety and Compensation Commission, the Liquor Commission, the Liquor Licensing Board.

References

Members of the Legislative Assembly of Nunavut
Inuit politicians
Living people
Year of birth missing (living people)
21st-century Canadian politicians
Inuit from the Northwest Territories
Inuit from Nunavut
Members of the Executive Council of Nunavut
Deputy premiers of Nunavut
People from Grise Fiord